Hector Monréal (17 July 1839 – 20 May 1910) was a French illustrator, chansonnier and playwright, mostly known for his song Frou-frou.

A draftsman at the French Ministry of War, he left this position in 1862 to engage as an actor for the Théâtre Montmartre (1862-1864). He then became a cartoonist at Le Petit journal where he made the summary-signs posted every morning at the newspaper's door. He then embarked into theatrical writing with Henri Blondeau. 
For forty years, their plays will be interpreted on the most important Parisian stages of the 19th century: Théâtre des Variétés, Théâtre du Château-d'Eau, Théâtre des Folies-Dramatiques etc.

Several of his songs were recorded and interpreted by Suzy Delair, Berthe Sylva, Bourvil or Line Renaud inter alia

Works 

1863: Les Oranges de mon étagère, chansonnette, music by Henri Cellot
1865: Ça n'coûte que deux sous ! grrrrande revue du moment déroulée tous les soirs par Heudebert au Café-concert du boulevard du Temple, with Blondeau
1867: Les Garçons charcuitiers !, poésie bachique et mélodique
1867: Les Marchands de bois, vaudeville in 1 act, with Saint-Yves
1867: Le Trombonne guérisseur (chanté dans les concerts de Paris)
1868: Les Hannetons de l'année, revue in 3 acts and 8 tableaux, including a prologue, with Blondeau
1868: Tapez-moi là-d'ssus !..., revue in 4 acts eand 8 tableaux, including 1 prologue, with Blondeau
1870: V'là les bêtises qui recommencent, revue in 4 acts and 8 tableaux, with Blondeau
1872: Qui veut voir la lune ?, revue fantaisie in 3 acts and 8 tableaux, with Blondeau
1872: Paris dans l'eau, vaudeville aquatique in 4 acts, with Blondeau
1872: Une poignée de bêtises, revue in 2 acts and 3 tableaux, with Blondeau
1872: La Veuve Malbrough, operetta in 1 act, with Blondeau
1873: La Nuit des noces de la Fille Angot, vaudeville in 1 act, with Blondeau
1873: Les Pommes d'or, operetta féerie in 3 acts and 12 tableaux, with Blondeau, Henri Chivot and Alfred Duru
1874: La Comète à Paris, revue in 3 acts and 10 tableaux, with Henri Blondeau
1874: Ah ! c'est donc toi Mme la Revue !..., revue in 3 acts and dix tableaux, with Blondeau
1875: Pif-Paf, féerie in 5 acts, including 1 prologue and 20 tableaux, with Blondeau and Clairville
1875: La revue à la vapeur, actualité parisienne in 1 act and 3 tableaux, with Blondeau and Paul Siraudin
1876: L'Ami Fritz-Poulet, parodie à la fourchette, mêlée de chansons à boire et à manger, en deux services, deux entremets et un dessert, with Blondeau
1877: Les Environs de Paris, voyage d'agrément in 4 acts and 8 tableaux, with Blondeau
1883: Une nuit de noces, folie-vaudeville in 1 act, with Blondeau
1884: Au clair de la lune, revue in 4 acts and 8 tableaux, with Blondeau and Georges Grisier
1885: Pêle-mêle gazette, revue in 4 acts and 7 tableaux, with Blondeau and Grisier
1885: La Serinette de Jeannot, vaudeville in 1 act, with Blondeau
1885: Les Terreurs de Jarnicoton, vaudeville-pantomime in 1 act, with Blondeau
1886: Paris en général, revue in 4 acts and 10 tableaux, with Blondeau and Grisier
1886: Le Petit Canuchon, vaudeville in 4 acts, with Grisier
1887: Mam'zelle Clochette, vaudeville in 1 act, with Blondeau
1887: Paris-cancans, revue in 3 acts and 8 tableaux, with Blondeau
1887: La Petite Francillon, little parody in 1 little prologue, 3 littles acts eand 2 littles intermissions, with Blondeau and Alphonse Lemonnier
1888: Paris-boulevard, revue in 3 acts, 8 tableaux, with Blondeau
1889: Paris Exposition, revue inn 3 acts, 9 tableaux, with Blondeau
1891: Paris port de mer, revue in 3 acts, 7 tableaux, with Blondeau
1892: Les Variétés de l'année, revue in 3 acts and 9 tableaux, with Blondeau
1893: Les Rouengaines de l'année, revue in 3 acts (7 tableaux including a prologue), with Ernest Morel
1894: La Revue sans gêne, revue in 3 acts, 9 tableaux, with Blondeau and Alfred Delilia
1894: Vive Robinson !, duo sans accords, with Blondeau and Delilia, music by Lucien Collin
1895: Tout Paris en revue, revue in 3 acts and 9 tableaux, with Blondeau
1896: Une Semaine à Paris, revue in 3 acts (11 tableaux), with Blondeau
1897: Paris qui marche, revue in 3 acts, 10 tableaux, with Blondeau
1897: Paris sur scène, revue in 3 acts, 8 tableaux, with Blondeau
1898: Folies-Revue, revue in 3 acts, 9 tableaux
1900: Madame Méphisto, pièce à spectacle, in 2 acts and 5 tableaux, with Blondeau
1901: La Nouvelle bonne, vaudeville in 1 act
1901: Paris-joujoux, revue in 2 acts and 6 tableaux, with Blondeau
1903: Le Cirque Ponger's, bouffonnerie with extravaganza in 1 act
1903: Paris qui chante, revue féerie in 2 acts and 12 tableaux, with Blondeau
1903: Olympia, revue in 4 tableaux, with Blondeau
1904: On demande une étoile, scènes de la vie de théâtre, with Blondeau
1909: Une Affaire arrangée, comedy in 1 act, with Ferdinand Bloch

Bibliography 
 Pierre Larousse, Nouveau Larousse illustré, supplément, 1906,  et Larousse mensuel illustré, volume 1, 1910, 
 Silvio D'Amico, Enciclopedia dello spettacolo, volume 5, 1962,

References

External links 
 Frou-frou on Youtube
 Hector Monréal sur artlyrique.fr (with portraits)
 Discographie sur discogs

19th-century French dramatists and playwrights
20th-century French dramatists and playwrights
19th-century French illustrators
French chansonniers
People from Carcassonne
1839 births
1910 deaths